The Singing Cowgirl is a 1938 American Western film directed by Samuel Diege.

Plot

Cast
Dorothy Page as Dorothy Hendricks
Dave O'Brien as Dick Williams
Vince Barnett as Kewpie
Warner Richmond as 'Gunhand' Garrick
Dorothy Short as Nora Pryde
Edward Peil Sr. as Tom Harkins
Dix Davis as Billy Harkins
Stanley Price as John Tolen
Paul Barrett as Rex Harkins
Lloyd Ingraham as Dr. Slocum

Soundtrack
 Dorothy Page - "I Gotta Sing" (Written by Al Sherman, Walter Kent and Milton Drake)
 Dorothy Page - "Prairie Boy" (Written by Al Sherman, Walter Kent and Milton Drake)
 Dorothy Page - "Let's Round up Our Dreams" (Written by Al Sherman, Walter Kent and Milton Drake)

Home media
On October 27, 2009, Alpha Video released The Singing Cowgirl on Region 0 DVD.

References

External links

1938 films
1938 Western (genre) films
American black-and-white films
Grand National Films films
American Western (genre) films
1930s English-language films
1930s American films